The 2007 Winton round of the V8 Supercar Championship is the fourth of the 2007 V8 Supercar season. It was held on the weekend of 18 to 20 May at Winton Motor Raceway in Victoria (Australia).

Pre-round
Two main stories occurred between the previously race at Pukekohe and this round. Firstly Brad Jones announced his immediate retirement from the V8 Supercar championship after a 20-year career. Jones will be replaced from the Winton round for the remainder of the season by Simon Wills. Secondly the Supercheap Auto Racing team was sold by Kees Weel to the No Limit Group. The sale however later fell apart without being completed.

Qualifying
Qualifying was held on Saturday 19 May 2007.

Part 1
The first session of qualifying began with Todd Kelly quickest, however his teammate at the Holden Racing Team Mark Skaife began with a spin. As Winton is a test track for a number of the teams, it could be seen that these teams had an advantage over the other teams. After the first session, Garth Tander was quickest from Todd Kelly and Jack Daniel's Racing’s Shane Price. However some of the bigger names did not back the top 20 drivers to advance to the second part of qualifying including Greg Murphy and Russell Ingall. Ingall was later relegated to the back of the grid after failing to have his car weighed after qualifying.

Part 2
In the second part of qualifying, Jason Richards of Tasman Motorsport was quickest at the start of the session. The session was relatively clean, however Steven Richards ran wide through the mud at turn 11. After the session, Todd Kelly, Garth Tander and Jason Richards were the top three, with both Mark Skaife and Craig Lowndes missing out.

Part 3
Part 3 of qualifying was a clean session, with Todd Kelly leading from Tander and Price at the midpoint of the session. As the session progressed, Tander and Jason Richards battled for second position.

After qualifying had finished, Todd Kelly took pole position from Garth Tander and Jason Richards. In their best qualifying session of the year, the Jack Daniels Racing team drivers of Shane Price and Jack Perkins qualified fifth and eighth respectively.

Race 1
Race 1 was held on Saturday 19 May 2007. The race started in wet conditions and this caused a number of incidents to occur in the first few laps. Garth Tander was able to take the lead on the first lap, however a number of drivers including Jason Bright, Mark Skaife, Russell Ingall and James Courtney all went off the track on the first lap.

On lap 2, Jason Richards run wide at turn 11 and went off the track from second position, and then on lap 3, the Todd Kelly in second collided with the leader Garth Tander causing Tander to spin. He rejoined the race in 12th position. Following this incident, Todd Kelly then spun off the track on lap 6 at turn 11 and got stuck in the gravel trap, which caused the safety car to come out.

The race was restarted on lap 9, however almost immediately Paul Dumbrell collided with Russell Ingall causing steering damage to Ingall's car which then went off the track and into the gravel trap. This again caused the safety car to come out.

At the restart on lap 12, Lee Holdsworth was able to take the lead from Mark Winterbottom before Winterbottom retook the lead at turn 3 of the same lap. Soon after, the safety car came out again as Todd Kelly spun off the track. Once the compulsory pit stops had been completed, Jamie Whincup lead from Rick Kelly and Craig Lowndes.

Towards the end of the race Mark Winterbottom, who was using slick tyres on the drying track collided with Max Wilson which caused Winterbottom to go off at turn 11 and caused the safety car to come out for a fourth time. The safety car came in with 3 laps to go, and James Courtney made a number of positions running on dry tyres.

At the end of the 40 laps, Jamie Whincup gave Ford their first win of the season from Steven Richards and Rick Kelly after Courtney was given a penalty for an incident wit Greg Murphy on the penultimate lap.

Race 2
Race 2 was held on Sunday 20 May 2007. The race was also held in wet conditions however the start was relatively clean. Mark Skaife once again had a bad race, running off the circuit at turn 11 on lap 5. He was also the first driver to change from wet weather tyres to slicks as the racing line dried on lap 10. This began a trend where the drivers lower down the field also changed to slick to try to take advantage of the drying track, while the leaders stayed on wet weather tyres.

On lap 14, Jason Richards spun off the track and crashed into the wall on slick tyres after driving off the dry race line. Craig Lowndes also had a spin at turn 1. The first safety car of the race occurred when Lee Holdsworth spun off the track and crashed heavily into the wall at turn 4. This caused major damage to the rear of the Garry Rogers Motorsport car. During the safety car period, it started raining again and the drivers that changed to slicks had to go back to wet weather tyres.

After the restart on lap 25, Jamie Whincup took the lead from Tander, however Tander retook the lead at turn 3 of the same lap. Over the last 10 laps, Tander and Whincup battled for the lead in damp conditions and while dealing with lapped traffic. At the end of the race, Garth Tander won, from Jamie Whincup and teammate Rick Kelly.

Race 3
Race 3 was held on Sunday 20 May 2007. The race began in dry conditions and this remained the same for the remainder of the race. Garth Tander lead the race in the early stages of the race. Steve Johnson retired for the race with an engine problem, and Mark Skaife also had a problem with the suspension of his car, ending a bad weekend for him.

The only safety car of the race was due to Paul Morris spinning off at turn 12 and becoming stuck in the sand trap. This was caused by oil which had been spilt on the approach to turn 12 and a number of drivers also rain wide and off the circuit because of the oil, however Morris was the only driver to get stuck.

The safety car came in on lap 27 and Tander continued to lead the race until the finish where he won the race from Jamie Whincup and Rick Kelly.

Results

Qualifying

Race 1 results

Race 2 results

Race 3 results

References

External links
 Winton Motor Raceway website

Winton
May 2007 sports events in Australia